Kashmiri papier-mâché is a handicraft of Kashmir that was brought by Muslim saint Mir Sayyid Ali Hamadani from Persia in the 14th century to medieval India. It is based primarily on paper pulp, and is a richly decorated, colourful artifact; generally in the form of vases, bowls, or cups (with and without metal rims), boxes, trays, bases of lamps, and many other small objects. These are made in homes, and workshops, in Srinagar, and other parts of the Kashmir Valley, and are marketed primarily within India, although there is a significant international market. The product is protected under the Geographic Indication Act 1999 of Government of India, and was registered by the Controller General of Patents Designs and Trademarks during the period from April 2011 to March 2012 under the title "Kashmir Paper Machie".

Etymology
Papier-mâché is the French word for "chewed paper", which is a standard English loan word, for objects made by moulding paper pulp in various shapes and then decorating them with designs in various colours. In the figurative sense the word 'papier-mâché' has come to be identified as the art of Kashmir.

History

The papier-mâché technique of using paper pulp for making decorative objects was first adopted in Kashmir in the 15th century by King Zain-ul-Abidin. Mir Sayyid Ali Hamadani, a Sufi mystic, came to Kashmir during the late 14th century along with his followers, many of whom were craftsmen.   These craftsmen used hand-made paper pulp from Iran, Central Asia. It is also said that the prince had been imprisoned in Samarkand in Central-Asia for many years.  The leader of craftsmen, Mir Syed Ali Hamdani, a Sufi mystic, also known as Shah-i-Hamdan, was also instrumental on converting people in Kashmir to Islam. These artists who were also well-versed in other handicrafts such as woodcarving, copper engraving and carpet weaving made Kashmir their permanent home. They settled here along with their families.

Earlier to this period the practice was to draw colourful paintings on wood on household furniture such as ceilings, bedsteads, doors and windows, palanquins and so forth. Internally this art form was called, kar-i-qulamdan as it was made as pen holders and a few other personal trinkets.  Another term used for the art was kar-i-munaqqash as it was crafted on smoothly finished surfaces created using paper pulp or on layers of polished paper. Even treated and stretched skin was used for the purpose. Starting with decorating jackets of books, the art covered many items of that period such as tables, table ware, bangles, lamp stands, cups, plaques, panels, screens and cabinets.

During the Mughal era, its use was extended to include many items of home furniture that were made in Kashmir. Many notable objects of this type are exhibited in museums in many parts of the world. The basic method followed was to apply the papier-mâché on wood work, and one such work can be seen in Kashmir at the Madin Sahib Mosque built in 1444, the ceiling of the Shah Hamdan Mosque and the Shalimar Garden, a Mughal garden in Srinagar. This tradition of using papier-mâché or pulp on wood work to be colourfully painted with different designs is very much in practice even today. Some of the older designs involved intricate painting of kingfishers, maple leaves and other designs, such as "Arabesque", "Yarkand" and "Hazara".

To encourage this art form to proliferate, the Government of Kashmir has included papier-mâché as a curriculum subject in schools.

Manufacturing process

The skilled artisans involved with this painstaking process are called sakhta makers. The materials involved with this process are discarded paper, cloth, straw of rice plant, copper sulfate, which are mixed and made into a pulp. The paper, after immersing in water for 4–5 weeks, is taken out and made into a pulp and dried. The dried paper is then converted to a powder. There is also a practice to mix the powdered paper with rice water to facilitate coagulation. The pulp thus made is applied on molds made in wood or brass. In earlier times, the mold was made of clay by the craftsman himself. It is also said that paper was just softened and not pulped and then applied in layers over the mold and drying it after covering each layer of pulp to get the desired shape.  At the wet stage of application, the layers were covered with a muslin cloth and overlaid with another layer of material similar to plaster of Paris, locally known as gutchi.

The present practice is, however, to complete the layering of pulp over the mold at one stage itself and then dry it before polishing it with gemstones. The artwork is then detached from the mold using a saw and then rejoined using dense glue. The joint is then rubbed slowly with a file made of wood known locally as kathwa. The surface is polished till all irregularities and edges become smooth. Then gold and silver foils are used in combination with the paste of chalk and glue mixture, which is applied to the exterior and interior surfaces of the object using a brush. After drying of the treated object, the surfaces are again polished using baked brick pieces. To prevent any cracking more paper strips are pasted and then polished again to smooth the surface, to get the colour of zamin or earth or of gold, white, black, blue or red. The surface of the object is demarcated with yellow colour, which is then followed by floral designs made in different colours in dark or light shades with application of adhesive compound called dor made of zarda, sugar and glue as adhesive, and applying gold or silver foils.

The art object is then dried and given a varnish coat made of amber locally called kahruba or copal (sandirus) in a solution of methyl spirit. It is then sun dried. Following this process of drying the surface of the art object is cleaned thoroughly with a wet cloth. Then the surface of the artwork is again treated with a coat of silver and gold foils and then designs are created over the surface followed by a smoothing of the surface using gemstones such as jade (yashm). Then the art piece is again sun-dried and made ready for painting. Distemper colours made with pigments and glue are used to paint the artwork with various designs. The brushes used for the painting are made of hair of goat, cat or donkey.  The practice was to use "craft mineral, organic and vegetable colours."

Challenges 
With new technologies and manufacturing techniques, the art of paper papier-mâché is slowly dying. The economic viability of the art, has taken a hit due to machine carving and artisans preferring other jobs. The art and its products most cater to the premier luxury sector with the price range on the upper side. Lower quality, cheaper machine products have given a tough challenge to the sector, with artisans struggling to keep the sector going.

References

Bibliography

Papier-mâché
Culture of Jammu and Kashmir
Indian handicrafts
Geographical indications in Jammu and Kashmir
15th-century introductions